The 2018–19 season was FC Ararat-Armenia's 1st season in Armenian Premier League, in which they won their first Championship and reached the Semifinal of the Armenian Cup.

Season events
On 2 August 2018, Vadim Skripchenko was appointed as the new head coach of Ararat-Armenia, before being sacked on 25 September, and Ararat-Armenia-2 manager Artak Oseyan being appointed as caretaker manager.

On 10 August, Ararat-Armenia sold both Erik Azizyan and Armen Hovhannisyan to Zemplín Michalovce.

On 1 October, Vardan Minasyan was appointed as the new head coach of Ararat-Armenia.

Squad

Out on loan

Transfers

In

Loans in

Out

Loans out

Released

Competitions

Overall record

Premier League

Results summary

Results

Table

Armenian Cup

Statistics

Appearances and goals

|-
|colspan="16"|Players away on loan:

|-
|colspan="16"|Players who left Ararat-Armenia during the season:

|}

Goal scorers

Clean sheets

Disciplinary Record

References

FC Ararat-Armenia seasons
Ararat-Armenia